The Admiral Joe Fowler was a riverboat ride vehicle named after Park Construction Administrator Joe Fowler, a former US Navy rear admiral who was in charge of the construction of both Disneyland and Walt Disney World.

History
The riverboat was built at the Tampa Ship Repair & Dry Dock Company in Tampa, Florida, the same place where the Walt Disney World Railroad's (WDWRR) four steam locomotives were refurbished.

The Admiral Joe Fowler riverboat entered service a day after the Magic Kingdom park opened on October 1, 1971. On May 20, 1973, a second riverboat named the Richard F. Irvine, which would later be renamed as the Liberty Belle in 1996, entered service.

But in late 1980, the Fowler riverboat was accidentally dropped from a crane while being lifted into the dry dock area for a routine overhaul, and its hull was completely destroyed beyond repair. The damaged riverboat was taken to a boneyard for a while before being broken up for scrap, after determining that the Magic Kingdom no longer needed two riverboats on the Rivers of America. The riverboat's steam engine machinery was being shipped to Tokyo Disneyland to be used as part of the Mark Twain riverboat.

In 1997, the Magic Kingdom I ferry, which crosses the Seven Seas Lagoon taking guests between the Transportation and Ticket Center and the Magic Kingdom park, was renamed to Admiral Joe Fowler. The Magic Kingdom II ferry was renamed to Richard F. Irvine.

See also
 Mark Twain Riverboat

References

External links
 Rivers of America Riverboats

Former Walt Disney Parks and Resorts attractions
Walt Disney Parks and Resorts gentle boat rides
Liberty Square (Magic Kingdom)
Amusement rides introduced in 1971
Amusement rides that closed in 1980
Western (genre) amusement rides
1971 establishments in Florida
1980 disestablishments in Florida
Paddle steamers of the United States